Claudia Fernández Azpeitia (born 11 July 2003) is a Spanish footballer who plays as a forward for Athletic Club.

Club career
Fernández started her career at Añorga.

References

External links
 
 Claudia Fernández at La Liga
 
 

2003 births
Living people
Women's association football forwards
Spanish women's footballers
Footballers from San Sebastián
Añorga KKE players
Real Sociedad (women) players
Primera División (women) players
Primera Federación (women) players
Athletic Club Femenino B players